Cytotherapy is a peer-reviewed medical journal covering the areas of cell and gene therapy. The journal was established in 1999 and the Senior Editor is Donald G. Phinney. It is published by Elsevier on behalf of the International Society for Cell & Gene Therapy (ISCT).

Aims and Scope
The Journal publishes novel and innovative results from high quality scientific and clinical studies in the fields of cell and gene therapy. Cytotherapy publishes articles exploring the following topics:

 Development and/or characterization of novel gene therapies and cell and/or EV-based therapeutics. 
 Design of novel therapeutic approaches employing cell/EV/gene products. 
 Mode of action of cell/EV/gene therapies in relevant cell-based and pre-clinical models. 
 Identification of novel biomarkers that predict the potency of cell/EV/gene therapies and/or stratify patients based on response rates. 
 Role of stem/stromal cells and/or EVs in disease pathophysiology. 
 Early and late phase clinical studies evaluating the safety and efficacy of cell/EV/gene therapies. 
 Important advances in cell/EV/gene-based product manufacturing and validation. 
 Global/regional regulatory practices that impact the authorized use and/or regulatory approval of cell/EV and gene therapies.

Abstracting and indexing
This journal is abstracted and indexed in Science Citation Index Expanded, Current Contents/Clinical Medicine, Current Contents/ Life Sciences, BIOSIS Previews, and MEDLINE/PubMed. According to the Journal Citation Reports, the journal has a 2020 impact factor of 5.414.

References

External links 
 

Publications established in 1999
English-language journals
Immunology journals
Molecular and cellular biology journals
Elsevier academic journals